China National Highway 304 (G304) runs northwest from Dandong, Liaoning towards Holingol, Inner Mongolia. It is 889 kilometres in length.

Route and distance

See also 
 China National Highways
 AH1

Transport in Liaoning
Transport in Inner Mongolia
304